The FIS Team Tour 2011 was a team competition that took place in Willingen, Klingenthal and Oberstdorf located in Germany, between 29 January and 6 February 2011.

Results

Overall

References

External links 
 Official website 

FIS Team Tour
2011 in ski jumping
2011 in German sport
January 2011 sports events in Germany
February 2011 sports events in Germany